Henri Laaksonen won the title, defeating Taylor Fritz in the final 4–6, 6–2, 6–2

Seeds

Draw

Finals

Top half

Bottom half

References
 Main Draw
 Qualifying Draw

JSM Challenger of Champaign-Urbana
JSM Challenger of Champaign–Urbana